The Love Ride was a charity motorcycle ride held annually in Southern California and in Switzerland. Its organizers bill it as "The Largest One-Day Motorcycle Fund-Raising Event in the World".

The American Love Ride was active between 1985 and 2015.

Harley-Davidson of Glendale, California 
The Love Ride was founded by Oliver Shokouh, the owner of a Harley-Davidson dealership in Glendale, California. Comedian and motorcycle buff Jay Leno served as Grand Marshal every year since 1985. Other celebrity participants have included Lorenzo Lamas and Larry Hagman, Robert Patrick, and musicians Lynyrd Skynyrd. The original ride in 1984 raised $1,500. In 2004, the ride raised over one million dollars.

The 2009 Love Ride was cancelled due to poor ticket sales and problems with sponsors, both attributed in part to the recession that began in 2008.

The final US Love Ride happened in 2015. Organizers said they had raised a total of more than $24 million in previous rides, and hoped to use the final event to top $25 million.

References

External links 
 LoveRide.org
 2005 LoveRide Gallery includes photos of Jay Leno and Orange County Chopper Family.

Motorcycle rallies in Switzerland
Motorcycle rallies in the United States